Wake Up Call is an American television business news program that aired on CNBC in the early morning. The program premiered in the 6 to 8 am timeslot ET on February 4, 2002. Later it was moved to 5 to 7 am timeslot. The previous program shown in the same time slot on CNBC was Today's Business. The program ended its run on December 16, 2005 and was replaced by Worldwide Exchange on December 19.

Overview
Originally co-anchored by Liz Claman and Carl Quintanilla (see complete anchor listing below), Wake Up Call was subsequently hosted by Michelle Caruso-Cabrera, sometimes in conjunction with a guest host.  The program used a slightly different graphics package to other CNBC program; in particular, a different format for the ticker.

Today's Business was the equivalent program on CNBC Europe and used the same theme music as Wake Up Call.  That program, which was hosted by Steve Sedgwick, ended its run on March 23, 2007 and replaced by Capital Connection on March 26, 2007.

There was also a program on CNBC Asia called Asia Wake Up Call.  It merged with Asia Squawk Box in 2003.

Wake Up Call anchors
Liz Claman and Carl Quintanilla (2002–03)
Liz Claman and Brad Goode (2003–04)
Michelle Caruso-Cabrera (first hour) and Brad Goode (second hour) (January–August 2005)
Michelle Caruso-Cabrera (entire show) (August–December 2005)

See also
Worldwide Exchange (a joint production, produced mainly by CNBC Europe, anchored from three continents)
Capital Connection (a joint production, produced mainly by CNBC Asia, anchored from two continents)

References

External links
 

2002 American television series debuts
2000s American television news shows
CNBC original programming
2005 American television series endings
Business-related television series